North Liberty is a town in Liberty Township, St. Joseph County, in the U.S. state of Indiana. The population was 1,896 at the 2010 Census. North Liberty is part of the South Bend–Mishawaka, IN-MI, Metropolitan Statistical Area.

History
North Liberty was laid out in 1836 or 1837 (sources differ). The North Liberty post office has been in operation since 1847.

The North Liberty Historic District and North Liberty Park are listed on the National Register of Historic Places.

Geography
North Liberty is located at  (41.533029, -86.430381).

Demographics

2010 census
As of the census of 2010, there were 1,896 people, 714 households, and 523 families living in the town. The racial makeup of the town was 96.2% White, 0.5% African American, 0.4% Native American, 0.4% Asian, 0.2% from other races, and 2.4% from two or more races. Hispanic or Latino of any race were 2.5% of the population.

There were 714 households, of which 45.0% had children under the age of 18 living with them, 44.8% were married couples living together, 23.4% had a female householder with no husband present, 5.0% had a male householder with no wife present, and 26.8% were non-families. 22.8% of all households were made up of individuals, and 10.6% had someone living alone who was 65 years of age or older. The average household size was 2.66 and the average family size was 3.12.

The median age in the town was 30.6 years. 32.8% of residents were under the age of 18; 10.5% were between the ages of 18 and 24; 26.2% were from 25 to 44; 19.5% were from 45 to 64; and 10.9% were 65 years of age or older. The gender makeup of the town was 46.7% male and 53.3% female.

2000 census
As of the census of 2000, there were 1,402 people, 559 households, and 399 families living in the town. The racial makeup of the town was 97.65% White, 0.43% African American, 0.21% Native American, 0.29% Pacific Islander, 0.29% from other races, and 1.14% from two or more races. Hispanic or Latino of any race were 0.71% of the population.

There were 559 households, out of which 39.0% had children under the age of 18 living with them, 49.2% were married couples living together, 18.2% had a female householder with no husband present, and 28.6% were non-families. 25.9% of all households were made up of individuals, and 13.1% had someone living alone who was 65 years of age or older. The average household size was 2.51 and the average family size was 3.00.

In the town, the population was spread out, with 30.3% under the age of 18, 8.0% from 18 to 24, 28.7% from 25 to 44, 18.8% from 45 to 64, and 14.3% who were 65 years of age or older. The median age was 34 years. For every 100 females, there were 92.3 males. For every 100 females age 18 and over, there were 87.5 males.

The median income for a household in the town was $34,850, and the median income for a family was $44,145. Males had a median income of $36,563 versus $23,281 for females. The per capita income for the town was $16,469. About 8.6% of families and 10.1% of the population were below the poverty line, including 16.0% of those under age 18 and 7.9% of those age 65 or over.

Education
It is in the John Glenn School Corporation. The district operates North Liberty Elementary School. Its secondary schools, in Walkerton, are Urey Middle School and John Glenn High School.

References

Towns in St. Joseph County, Indiana
Towns in Indiana
South Bend – Mishawaka metropolitan area
Populated places established in 1836
1836 establishments in Indiana